Ear shaping is the process of altering the shape of the human ear(s) as a body modification practice, often resulting in a non-human appearance.  The medical procedure via which ears are reshaped to give a normal appearance is known as otoplasty. Ear shaping is usually performed by body modification artists.

There are several ways in which human ears can be given a different appearance including cropping, pointing, and the amputation of various parts of the ear.  The various methods may be combined to give specific results.

Amputation

In this form of ear shaping, the lobe or other portions of the ear are amputated to give the desired look. This may also be undertaken to remove stretched portions that are no longer wanted.  Sutures or cauterizing may be required.

Cropping

Ear cropping is commonly performed on animals, for both cosmetic and other reasons, but rarely on humans.  In humans, cropping usually involves the removal of part of the upper ear with a scalpel.  Suturing or cauterizing may be required.

Pointing

Ear pointing or "elfing" by various methods is undertaken to give them an appearance similar to that of elves or Vulcans.  A common method is to remove a small wedge-shaped portion at the top of the ear, and then suture the two edges. The development of this procedure is generally credited to Steve Haworth.

Originally the shape was achieved by folding and trimming the client's helix and sutured together to achieve a pointed look. But a new procedure has been developed by Samppa Von Cyborg, which gives the pointed ears a far more natural look.

References

Body modification
Ear surgery